Nowe Draganie  is a village in the administrative district of Gmina Stara Biała, within Płock County, Masovian Voivodeship, in east-central Poland.

Nowe Draganie is in the valley of the river Vistula River.

History
After the Partition of the Polish–Lithuanian Commonwealth, the district was part of the area annexed by Prussia.
In October 1939 the Nazi occupation transferred the village to be part of the Zichenau (region) of East Prussia. The district was returned to Poland after World War II.

In 2011 the population of the village was 84.
Between 1975 and 1998 the village was in Plock Province. The post code is 09-411.

See also
Stare Draganie

References

Nowe Draganie